The Halloween Cup is an annual international figure skating competition organized by the Hungarian National Skating Federation. It is held every October in Budapest, Hungary. Medals are awarded in the disciplines of men's singles, ladies' singles, and ice dancing at various levels which may include senior, junior, novice, and below.

Senior medalists

Men

Ladies

Ice dancing

Junior medalists

Men

Ladies

Ice dancing

Novice medalists

Men

Ladies

Ice dancing

References

External links 
 Halloween Cup Official Homepage
 Hungarian National Skating Federation

International figure skating competitions hosted by Hungary
Figure skating in Hungary